is a stony asteroid, classified as near-Earth object and potentially hazardous asteroid of the Apollo group, approximately 1.1 kilometers in diameter. It was discovered on 9 August 1994, by astronomer Robert McNaught at the Siding Spring Observatory in Coonabarabran, Australia. With an observation arc of 47 years it has a very well known orbit and was observed by Goldstone radar in January 1997. The 2022 approach has been observed every month since August 2021.

Orbit and classification 

 orbits the Sun at a distance of 0.9–1.8 AU once every 1 years and 7 months (572 days). Its orbit has an eccentricity of 0.33 and an inclination of 33° with respect to the ecliptic.

Physical characteristics 

In the SMASS classification,  is a common stony S-type asteroid.

Rotation period 

Lightcurve analysis gave a well-defined rotation period of 2.5999 hours with a brightness amplitude of 0.29 magnitude.

Diameter and albedo 

According to the survey carried out by the NEOWISE mission of NASA's Wide-field Infrared Survey Explorer,  measures 1.052 kilometers in diameter and its surface has an albedo of 0.277. The Collaborative Asteroid Lightcurve Link assumes an albedo of 0.20 and calculates a diameter of 1.30 kilometers based on an absolute magnitude of 16.8.

2022 flyby 

At 18 January 2022 21:51 UTC,  passed 5.15 lunar distances from Earth and had a 3-sigma uncertainty region of less than ± 50 km. It peaked at an apparent magnitude of about 10 placing it just outside the reach of common 7×50 binoculars. The nearly Full moon being about 100 degrees from the asteroid during closest approach may have made it more difficult to observe with smaller telescopes.

Naming 

As of 2022, this minor planet has not been named.

See also 
 List of asteroid close approaches to Earth in 2022
  – ~800 meters in diameter and passed 4.57 LD from Earth on 19 April 2017
  – ~900 meters in diameter and will pass 0.65 LD from Earth on 26 June 2028

Notes

References

External links 
 A Giant Asteroid Bigger Than The Empire State Building Is About to Zip Past Earth  (Fiona MacDonald 5 January 2022)
 Huge asteroid will pass Earth safely January 18 (Eddie Irizarry December 30, 2021)
 Asteroid Lightcurve Database (LCDB), query form (info )
 Sky and Telescope: The kilometer-wide, potentially hazardous asteroid 1994 PC1 will fly past Earth on January 18th.
 Dictionary of Minor Planet Names, Google books
 Asteroids and comets rotation curves, CdR – Observatoire de Genève, Raoul Behrend
 
 
 

007482
Discoveries by Robert H. McNaught
007482
007482
20220118
19940809